The 1973 Connecticut Huskies football team represented the University of Connecticut in the 1973 NCAA Division II football season.  The Huskies were led by first-year head coach Larry Naviaux, and completed the season with a record of 8–2–1.

Schedule

References

Connecticut
UConn Huskies football seasons
Yankee Conference football champion seasons
Connecticut Huskies football